Marva Black Beck (born November 21, 1944) was a Republican member of the Texas House of Representatives for District 57.

Personal life
Marva Black was born on November 21, 1944 in Centerville, Texas. Beck grew up in Houston's 5th Ward, she graduated from San Jacinto High School She married Melvin S. Beck II on December 4, 1970 in Harris County, Texas, they had 3 sons James, Rick, and Trey. Beck attends First Methodist Church of Centerville and is the church treasurer. Becks son Rick died in a boating accident and her son James died in a motor vehicle accident. Becks husband Melvin died of cancer on March 13, 2004, six months after the death of her son James. Trey works in the construction industry in Houston, Texas.

Political career
Beck represented District 57 in the Texas House of Representatives during the 82nd legislature. While in the state house she served on the Homeland Security and Public Safety Committee and the Natural Resources Committee. She also served as chairman of the Lee County Republican Party.

Elections

2012
Beck went up against challenger Trent Ashby in the Republican primary. Ashby raised over 300,000 most from in district donors, Beck raised ~180,000. Beck claimed that Ashby raised taxes on the Lufkin ISD School Board to increase the salary of the superintendent, Ashby and other Lufkin ISD trustees claimed this was false.

2010

Beck unseated 12 year Democratic incumbent Jim Dunnam.

References

1944 births
Living people
Republican Party members of the Texas House of Representatives